HGY may refer to:
 Harringay railway station, in London
 Hooghly railway station, in West Bengal, India
 Yaoundé General Hospital, in Cameroon